Joseph Anthony McDonald (born July 5, 1929) is a former front office executive in American Major League Baseball. McDonald served as general manager of three MLB clubs between 1975 and 1992, and had a long career in the game as an administrator and a scout. Born in Staten Island, New York City, he is a 1951 graduate of Fordham University.

Long career with New York Mets
He played prominent roles in the New York Mets' organization during his tenure there between 1962 and 1980. McDonald was the Mets' administrative secretary, minor league clubs, where he dealt with farm system operations in 1965–66. In 1967, he was the director of scouting. In 1968, he moved up and became director of minor league operations, and he stayed in that position until 1971. In 1972, he served as the Mets' director of player development operations. In 1973, he again became director of minor league operations, and he stayed in that position until October 1974, when he was promoted to general manager. He served in that role until 1978. In 1979, he was named a vice president and also worked as an assistant general manager. He stayed in that position until he was fired on February 21, 1980 when the team was sold.

GM of Cardinals and Tigers
In 1981, he became the St. Louis Cardinals' executive assistant, where he served as an assistant general manager to Whitey Herzog, the Cards' GM and field manager. McDonald and Herzog had worked closely together in the Mets' farm system from 1966–72. He was assistant GM in St. Louis until April 10, 1982, when he became the Cardinals' general manager, thus enabling Herzog to focus on his on-field responsibilities. McDonald resigned from that post on January 3, 1985.

In 1987, he became the Detroit Tigers' director of player development (he also served as vice president). He stayed in that position until 1991, when he became a senior vice president as well as general manager through 1992.

Scout for Angels, Rockies and Red Sox
He later scouted for the California Angels, Colorado Rockies and in 2004 he became a scout at the professional level for the Boston Red Sox, based in Lakeland, Florida. He retired at age 90 after the  season.

Personal life

He has one son, Jody. Jody McDonald is currently a sports talk radio host who has worked in Philadelphia and New York City.

References

1929 births
Living people
Anaheim Angels scouts
Boston Red Sox scouts
California Angels scouts
Colorado Rockies scouts
Detroit Tigers executives
Fordham University alumni
Major League Baseball farm directors
Major League Baseball general managers
New York Mets executives
People from Staten Island
St. Louis Cardinals executives